The Varsity Game is an annual basketball fixture played between the University of Oxford and the University of Cambridge which dates back to 1921. The first post-war Varsity Game was played on 11 June 1949 at RAF Halton and resulted in a 47-11 Oxford win. It has remained an annual event ever since.

In the 1950s, The Varsity Game between Oxford and Cambridge was one of the highlights of the British basketball calendar. The game was of national interest and was held at the Empire Pool and Indoor Arena, Wembley. Uncommon for basketball in the United Kingdom, the Oxford-Cambridge rivalry basketball game received coverage from the national press.

The Varsity Game holds a special reverence for the basketball teams at Oxford and Cambridge. Traditionally, it is the final game of the season for both teams and is the highlight of the basketball season. In the 14 March 1966 edition of Sports Illustrated, NBA Hall-of-famer Bill Bradley said in reference to The Varsity Game: "'This game,' remarked Bradley, who flew back from playing with the Italian Simmenthal team in Milan the morning of the event, 'is the only one I care about.'"

References 

Basketball
Varsity Game
Annual sporting events in the United Kingdom
Basketball competitions in England